David Campbell was an MP in the Irish Parliament.

Campbell was born in Westminster and educated at Trinity College, Dublin. He was MP for Bangor from 1692 to 1698.

References

Alumni of Trinity College Dublin
People from Westminster
Irish MPs 1692–1693
Irish MPs 1695–1699
Members of the Parliament of Ireland (pre-1801) for County Down constituencies